The House of Sanguszko is a Polish and Lithuanian noble and aristocratic family of Lithuanian and Ruthenian origin, connected to the Gediminid dynasty. Like other princely houses of Polish–Lithuanian Commonwealth, its origins are considered murky. Present historical opinion holds in favour of their descent from Algirdas' grandson Alexander (fl. 1433–1443), lord of Kovel and Liuboml, whose name can be shortened to Sangush. The family supposedly descends from two lines, associated with two of his sons, Alexander and Michael.

The senior line, called the Sanguszko-Koszyrski, has been extinct since the death of Adam Aleksander Sanguszko in 1653. The junior line, or the Sanguszko-Kowelski, of Szymon Samuel Sanguszko, subsequently assumed the title Sanguszko-Lubartowicz, according to the erroneous assumption of their descent from Algirdas' younger brother Liubartas.

Prince Paweł Karol Sanguszko-Lubartowicz (1682–1752), a Court and Grand Marshal of Lithuania, greatly expanded his holdings through his second marriage with Marianna Lubomirska, heiress of Ostroh. His chief residence at Iziaslav (now in Ukraine) was embellished with a famous collection of Persian carpets, known as Sanguszko carpets. Hieronymous Sanguszko (1743–1812) founded the Volhynia stud, establishing the family as breeders of Arabian horses.

After the partitions of Poland, Eustachy Erazm Sanguszko fought in the Kościuszko Uprising and Napoleon's Russian campaign. His son, Prince Roman Sanguszko, was a Polish officer who participated in the November Uprising, and was exiled to Siberia. His life is the subject of "Prince Roman" (1910) one of Joseph Conrad's short stories. With the incorporation of Galicia into Soviet Ukraine after World War II, the Sanguszkos lost their Gumniska and Sławuta estates, as well as their palace in Lviv, and emigrated to Brazil.

By the late 20th century, the family was represented by a single descendant, Prince Paul (born 1973), who resides in São Paulo. His mother came from the Polignac lineage. In 2010 Olympia Sanguszko was born to Prince Paul and his wife.

Lineages
 koszyrsko-niesuchoiżska (Kamień Koszyrski-Niesuchojeże line) – split into two primary lineages:
 gałąź koszyrska – Sanguszkowie-Koszyrscy (Kamień Koszyrski branch) – the male branch died out in 1653; descendants in the female line still exist today in Kiev; 
 gałąź niesuchoiżska – Sanguszkowie-Niesuchoiżscy  (Niesuchojeże branch) – the branch died out in 1591;
 linia kowelska – Sanguszkowie-Kowelscy (Kowel line) – existing until today.

Notable members

Generation 0 
 Alexander Feodorovich (died c. 1454), progenitor of the Sanguszko family

Generation 1 
 Aleksander Sanguszkowic (died c. 1491), progenitor of the Sanguszko Kamień Koszyrski-Niesuchojeże line
 Michał Sanguszkowic (died c. 1511), progenitor of the Sanguszko Kowel line
 Ivan Sanguszkowic, progenitor of the Sadovski family

Generation 2 
 Michał (died c. 1501)
 Andrzej Aleksandrowicz Sanguszko (died c. 1534/5), starost of Włodzimierz
 Wasyl Sanguszko (died c. 1557), courtier

Generation 3 
 Andrzej Michałowicz Sanguszko (died 1560), marszałek hospodarski
 Fiodor Sanguszko (died 1547/8), starost of Włodzimierz, Bracław and Winnica
 Helena Andreevna Sangushko (1490–1561), Kamień Koszyrski branch, existing until today in Kiev
 Herhory (died 1555)

Generation 4 
 Aleksander Sanguszko (c. 1508–1565), marszałek hospodarski
 Dymitr Sanguszko
 Roman Sanguszko (c. 1537–1571), voivode of Bracław, Field Hetman of Lithuania
 Andrzej Sanguszko (died. 1591)

Generation 5 
 Lew Sanguszko (c. 1536–1571), rotmistrz of Lithuanian cavalry 
 Lew-Roman Sanguszko (died 1591), the last member of the Sanguszko Niesuchojeże branch
 Samuel Szymon Sanguszko (died 1638), voivode of Witebsk, writer. He converted to Catholicism.

Generation 6 
 Hrehory Sanguszko (died 1602), castelan of Lubaczów and Bracław 
 Hieronim Władysław Sanguszko (1611–1657), bishop of Smoleńsk
 Jan Władysław Sanguszko (died 1652)

Generation 7 
 Adam Aleksander Sanguszko (c. 1590–1653), voivode of Wołyń, the last member of the Sanguszko Kamień Koszyrski branch
 Hieronim (1651–1684)

Generation 8 
 Kazimierz Antoni Sanguszko (1677–1706), Court Marshal of Lithuania 
 Anna Katarzyna Radziwiłłowa (1676–1746) 
 Paweł Karol Sanguszko (1680–1750), Court Marshal of Lithuania, Grand Marshal of Lithuania 
 Barbara Urszula Sanguszkowa (1718–1791), poet, translator, philanthropist, wife of Paweł Karol

Generation 9 
 Janusz Aleksander Sanguszko (1712–1775), miecznik, Court Marshal of Lithuania 
 Józef Paulin Sanguszko (1740–1781), Grand Marshal of Lithuania
 Hieronim Janusz Sanguszko (1743–1812), general, voivode of Wołyń 
 Janusz Modest Sanguszko (1749–1806), starost of Krzemieniec

Generation 10 
 Tekla Teresa Lubienska (1767–1810), granddaughter of Barbara Urszula, playwright, poet and translator
 Eustachy Erazm Sanguszko (1768–1844), general, deputy and horse breeder
 Klementyna Maria Sanguszkowa (1780–1852), philanthropist

Generation 11 
 Roman Stanisław Sanguszko (1800–1881), participated in the November Uprising in 1830, exiled to Siberia, subject of "Prince Roman" (1910), one of Joseph Conrad's short stories.
 Władysław Hieronim Sanguszko (1803–1870), conservative politician
 Dorota Sanguszko (1799–1821)

Generation 12 
 Jadwiga Sanguszko (1830–1918), wife of Adam Stanisław Sapieha, mother of cardinal Adam Stefan Sapieha
 Roman Damian Sanguszko (1832–1917), ordynat of Zasław and collector
 Paweł Roman Sanguszko (1834–1876), landlord
 Eustachy Stanisław Sanguszko (1842–1903) marshal, namiestnik of Galicia 
 Helena Sanguszko (1836–1891)

Generation 13 
 Roman Władysław Sanguszko (1901–1984), landlord, horse breeder, industrialist and philanthropist

Generation 14 
 Piotr Antoni Samuel Sanguszko (1937–1989)

Generation 15 
 Paweł Franciszek Roman Sanguszko (born 1973), the last living member of the Sanguszko family

Palaces

External links
 Sanguszko at the Encyclopedia of Ukraine
 History of the family, Tarnów museum
Sanguszko stallions

Sanguszko family
Polish noble families